The 1920 United States presidential election in Wisconsin was held on November 2, 1920, as part of the 1920 United States presidential election. State voters chose 13 electors to the Electoral College, who voted for president and vice president.

Background
Wisconsin had ever since the decline of the Populist movement been substantially a one-party state dominated by the Republican Party. The Democratic Party became entirely uncompetitive outside certain German Catholic counties adjoining Lake Michigan as the upper classes, along with the majority of workers who followed them, completely fled from William Jennings Bryan’s agrarian and free silver sympathies. As Democratic strength weakened severely after 1894 – although the state did develop a strong Socialist Party to provide opposition to the GOP – Wisconsin developed the direct Republican primary in 1903 and this ultimately created competition between the “League” under Robert M. La Follette, and the conservative “Regular” faction.

The beginning of the 1910s would see a minor Democratic revival as many La Follette progressives endorsed Woodrow Wilson, but this flirtation would not be long-lasting as Wilson's “Anglophile” foreign policies were severely opposed by Wisconsin's largely German- and Scandinavian-American populace. The 1918 mid-term elections saw the Midwestern farming community largely desert the Democratic Party due to supposed preferential treatment of Southern farmers: Democratic seats in the Midwest fell from thirty-four to seventeen, whilst Scandinavian-Americans were also vigorously opposed to entering the war. Furthermore, Democratic fear of Communism seen in the Palmer Raids and "Red Scare" led to ultimate nominee James M. Cox, then Governor of Ohio, to ban German-language instruction in public schools in 1919. Still more critical for German-Americans was the view that outgoing President Woodrow Wilson was deliberately trying to punish Germany and Austria for starting the war, especially via his disregard for the United Kingdom's continuing blockade of Germany. Stressing Harding's German ancestry, the German press drummed up the view that

As the campaign began after the Republican Party had nominated U.S. Senator Warren G. Harding of Ohio and the Democratic Party former Ohio governor James M. Cox, a further blow to the Democrats came when the national economy suffered a major downturn following the wartime boom, resulting in plummeting agricultural prices that were especially problematic in the Midwest. Whereas Cox travelled throughout the nation apart from the "Solid South" during September, Harding, despite having four times the budget, campaigned from his home in Marion, Ohio.

Vote
A poll by the giant Rexall drug store chain – which in 1916 had been accurate enough to predict Wilson's razor-thin wins in New Hampshire and California – suggested Harding would win 382 electoral votes, and at the end of October, although no more opinion polls had been published, most observers were even more convinced that the Republicans would take complete control of all branches of government. Polls were similarly confident in Wisconsin, despite forecasts of a big vote for imprisoned fifth-time Socialist nominee Eugene V. Debs. Expectations of a landslide were fully realised: whereas Charles Evans Hughes had carried Wisconsin by only 6.59 points in 1916, Harding won this arch-isolationist state by a nine-to-two majority. Wisconsin would prove to be Harding's fourth strongest state in the 1920 election terms of popular vote percentage after North Dakota, Vermont and Michigan. Wisconsin would prove Cox's weakest state in the largest landslide loss in United States presidential election history, and Debs’ strongest state in his last campaign for the presidency. Despite Debs’ substantial vote, Harding carried all Wisconsin's counties with absolute majorities, becoming the only candidate to ever win every single Wisconsin county in a presidential election, and Cox cracked twenty-three percent of the vote in just three counties.

This would be the last time a Republican presidential candidate carried Iron County until Richard Nixon in 1972.

Results

Results by county

See also
 United States presidential elections in Wisconsin

Notes

References

Wisconsin
1920 Wisconsin elections
1920